SCMB may refer to:

 Santa Cruz and Monterey Bay Railroad
 La Chimba Airport
 , the school system supporting the Brazilian Armed Forces, particularly children of personnel
 School of Chemistry & Molecular Biosciences at the University of Queensland